We Stick Together Through Thick and Thin (German: Wir halten fest und treu zusammen) is a 1929 German silent comedy film directed by Herbert Nossen and starring Sig Arno, Kurt Gerron and Ernst Karchow. It was one of two films starring Arno and Gerron in their characters of 'Beef' and 'Steak' in an effort to create a German equivalent to Laurel and Hardy. It premiered at the Marmorhaus in Berlin.

Cast
 Sig Arno as Beef 
 Kurt Gerron as Steak 
 Ernst Karchow as Theodor Klabautermann 
 Vera Schmiterlöw as Kitty, Tochter 
 Evi Eva as Köchin 
 Antonie Jaeckel as Freifrau von Gotha, Heiratsvermittlerin 
 Lotte Roman as Stubenmädchen 
 Edith Meller as Carola Triller 
 Claire Claery  
 Carl Geppert as Assessor 
 Ewald Wenck as Assessor 
 Arnold Hasenclever as Teddy 
 Max Grünberg as Justizrat Scharf 
 Otto Hoppe as Geschäftsführer des Restaurants Newa-Grill

See also
 Revolt in the Batchelor's House (1929)

References

Bibliography
 Prawer, S.S. Between Two Worlds: The Jewish Presence in German and Austrian Film, 1910-1933. Berghahn Books, 2005.

External links
 

1929 films
1929 comedy films
German comedy films
Films of the Weimar Republic
German silent feature films
German sequel films
German black-and-white films
Buddy comedy films
Silent comedy films
1920s German films